Sri Valli is a 1945 Tamil-language film co-directed by A. V. Meiyappan and produced by him under Pragathi Studios. It was co-directed by A. T. Krishnaswamy who also wrote the script. The film stars T. R. Mahalingam and Kumari Rukmani. Sri Valli revolves around the romance between Muruga and Valli, a tribal girl. The rest of the story shows how Valli wins the heart of Murugan.

Sri Valli was the first Tamil film to introduce playback singing for the first time through lip synchronisation and also became the first film in which the dialogues were released in Gramaphone records. T. M. Rajagopal Sharma and R. Sudarsanam respectively composed the film's music and P. V. Krishna Iyer served as the cinematographer. The film was edited by the duo M. V. Raman, while V. M. Vatturkar and S. Ammaiyappan were the film's art directors.

Upon release, Sri Valli received critical acclaim and went on to become a commercially successful venture at box office. It is considered to be a breakthrough film for both T. R. Mahalingam and Kumari Rukmini.

Cast 

 T. R. Mahalingam as Velan, Hunter, Old Man
 Kumari Rukmani as Valli
 Baby Kamala as Young Valli, Young Subramanyam
 K. Mahadevan as Naradar
 T. R. Ramachandran as Killi
 G. Sowdamini as Melli
 S. Kuppusami Iyengar as Nambirajan
 K. Nagalakshmi as Mohini
 N. S. Krishnan as Athan
 T. A. Mathuram as Subbamma

Production 
After releasing the Tamil dubbed version of Kannada film Satya Harischandra (1943), A. V. Meiyappan decided to direct a film based on the folk tale of Valli. A. T. Krishnaswamy who co-directed the film wrote the script. Prior to the commencement of shooting, Meiyappan and his wife visited key Lord Murugan temples to seek forgiveness if by oversight makes any mistakes in any of the scenes from the film. The film was made on a budget of 2 lakh (worth 15 crore in 2021 prices) and returned 900 per cent on investment for AVM.

Initially Meiyappan had Thyagaraja Bagavathar in mind for the lead role. T. R. Mahalingam who earlier acted as child artist in Meiyappan's Nandakumar (1938) was signed on for the lead role and also as a part of contract that he should not act in any film or play until the completion of the film. For the titular character, Vasundhara Devi was initially considered and she insisted on selecting the lead actor for herself. After many names were suggested, she rejected them all and opted out. Kumari Rukmini who earlier appeared as child artist in films like Balayogini (1937) was signed as Meiyappan felt that her eyes will be a big attraction. T. R. Ramachandran, N. S. Krishnan and T. A. Mathuram were selected to appear in supporting roles.

The film was shot at the Pragathi Studio and the outdoor scenes were picturised in and around Adyar, including the Theosophical Society premises. The four-year old elephant was brought from Trichur for one of the characters. Sami Iyer who owned the elephant refused to take any money and allowed the elephant to act in the film. After completing the film, Meiyappan saw the first copy and was satisfied with the songs sung by Mahalingam, but was not satisfied with the singing of Rukmini in songs. Meiyappan decided to record the voice of Periyanayaki in place of Rukmini. It was recorded by sound engineer V. S. Raghavan through post synchronisation method. Kumari Rukmini did not accept the voice of Periyanayaki for her as she felt that the film came out well, she insisted on cancelling the three film agreement which she had signed as part of compensation. AVM who was keen on receiving success cancelled the agreement.

Themes and influences 
The original story was based on a folk tale which describes the romance between Lord Muruga and Valli, a tribal girl. Initially exhibited as stage plays, the story was developed into a silent film titled Valli Thirumanam in 1921. It was followed by another silent release, Sri Subramanyam in 1930. N. D. Sarpotdhar remade the film the same year for the "Aryan Film Company" and named it as Subramaniam. Another version titled Valli Kalyanam released the same year where Sundar Rao Nadkarni enacted the lead role.

The first talkie version of the story was produced by Samikannu Vincent in 1933. Named Valli Thirumanam, the film was shot in Calcutta and directed by P. V. Rao. T. P. Rajalakshmi played the role of Valli in the which ultimately became a box-office success. Sixteen years later after the 1945 film, a colour Sri Valli (1961 film) based on the same story was produced by Narasu Studios. It had Sivaji Ganesan and Padmini as the lead pair. T. R. Mahalingam who played Muruga in the previous version was given the role of Narada in this film.

Soundtrack 
The music was composed by TR Rajagopal Sharma and R Sudarsanam respectively while lyrics were written by Papanasam Sivan and Raja Gopal Iyer. All the songs well received especially "Kaayatha Kaanagathe". The song "Kaayatha Kaanagathe" is based on Bhairavi raga, while "Ellorayum Pole" is based on Shuddha Saveri.

Release 
The film was released on 13 April 1945. During the re-release of the film, Meiyappan replaced the vocals of Periyanayaki in place of Rukmini and included it in new set of prints. The film ran for 55 weeks in Central Theatre, Madurai. In his book Pride of Tamil Cinema, 1931 to 2013, G. Dhananjayan stated that the film's success was "largely boosted by TR Mahalingam and Periyanayaki's excellent songs". Randor Guy of The Hindu wrote that the film was remembered for "the melodious music and hit songs of Mahalingam and Periyanayaki".

Legacy 
Sri Valli is remembered for the first Tamil film to use playback singing through post synchronisation as the original audio of the songs erased and being replaced with different audio. It also became the first Tamil film for which the dialogues of the film being released in Gramaphone records. The film became a breakthrough for the lead pair Mahalingam and Rukmini and playback singer Periyanayaki.

References

Bibliography

External links 
 

1945 films
Hindu devotional films
Hindu mythological films
1940s Tamil-language films
Films scored by R. Sudarsanam
Indian black-and-white films
AVM Productions films